The Thomas Henry Pentland Molson Prize for the Arts is awarded by the Canada Council for the Arts. Two prizes are awarded annually to distinguished individuals. One prize is awarded in the arts, one in the social sciences and humanities. The prizes are $50,000 each, and intended to encourage continuing contribution to the cultural and intellectual heritage of Canada.

Endowment
Funded by an endowment from the Molson Foundation, the prizes are administered by the Canada Council for the Arts in cooperation with the Social Sciences and Humanities Research Council of Canada. Laureates are chosen by a peer assessment committee appointed jointly by the Canada Council and the Social Sciences and Humanities Research Council of Canada.

Eligibility
Candidates must be Canadian citizens or permanent residents of Canada. To be nominated, candidates must have made a substantial and distinguished contribution over a significant period of time. In the words of the deed of gift, the prizes are intended "to encourage Canadians of outstanding achievement in the fields of the Arts, the Humanities or the Social Sciences to make further contribution to the cultural or intellectual heritage of Canada". The terms of reference are interpreted as follows:
outstanding achievement must have already been amply demonstrated
further contribution implies that the laureates should still be very active and productive. 

In other words, the prize is not intended as an "end of service" reward or as recognition for one great accomplishment. Past assessment committees have been quite consistent in choosing laureates who are close to the top of an outstanding career. Corporations and other organizations are excluded from consideration, as are posthumous awards. No individual may be awarded the prize more than once. The prizes are accessible to qualified persons from Aboriginal Peoples and diverse cultural and regional communities. Members of the board of the Canada Council for the Arts and the Social Sciences and Humanities Research Council are not eligible to be considered for this prize during the course of their terms as members nor for six months following the end of their term.

Nomination process
Candidates may not apply for the Canada Council for the Arts Molson Prizes on their own behalf. They must be nominated by three individuals or three organizations, or a combination of individuals and organizations. Nominations are sought from persons and organizations that have the interest and capacity to nominate appropriate individuals. Nominators may submit one letter signed by the three nominating individuals or organizations, or submit three separate letters of nomination. Nominators are responsible for gathering and providing relevant documentation to the Canada Council.

Selection procedure
The two laureates are chosen by a single, multidisciplinary peer assessment committee co-chaired by the Chairman of the Canada Council for the Arts and the President of the Social Sciences and Humanities Research Council of Canada. Members are chosen to ensure fair representation of gender, the two official languages, the various regions and cultures of Canada, and the various types of artistic and scholarly disciplines. Committee members are among the most accomplished individuals in their respective fields and, ideally, have interests that extend beyond the confines of a single discipline.

List of recipients

References

External links 
List of award recipients

Canadian awards
Awards established in 1962
1962 establishments in Canada
Molson family
Humanities awards